René Pascucci (19 December 1926 – 9 March 2018) was a Luxembourgian footballer. He played in 15 matches for the Luxembourg national football team from 1951 to 1960.

References

External links
 

1926 births
2018 deaths
Luxembourgian footballers
Luxembourg international footballers
Place of birth missing
Association footballers not categorized by position